Ilias Savvidis (born 3 January 1967) is a retired Greek football midfielder.

References

1967 births
Living people
Greek footballers
People from Serres (regional unit)
Panserraikos F.C. players
Olympiacos F.C. players
Aris Thessaloniki F.C. players
Ionikos F.C. players
Panachaiki F.C. players
Super League Greece players
Greece international footballers
Association football midfielders
Footballers from Central Macedonia